Mystic Warriors: Wrath of the Ninjas, known in Japan as  is a ninja-themed side-scrolling action game released as an arcade video game by Konami in 1992. It was developed by the same team that produced Sunset Riders and has similar gameplay to its predecessor, along with hack-and-slash elements. It was the debut title for Konami's Mystic Warriors-based hardware.

Gameplay  

The game's controls consists of an eight-way joystick and two buttons for attacking and jumping. Like in Sunset Riders, the player can jump between higher or lower levels, as well as slide. The player character attacks primarily by shooting an unlimited supply of shurikens/daggers, or using his/her weapon at close range. The game includes some improvements that were not included in Sunset Riders, such as the ability for players to change characters after they lose a credit as well as a life gauge that allows the player to sustain up to four hits from enemy attacks before losing a life.

The player must defeat box-carrying enemies in order to obtain power-up items. These include a shuriken power-up that can increase the player's shooting power by up to two levels (which differ between characters), food (sushi, tempura, udon, sukiyaki) that will replenish the player's life gauge, a blue orb with the kanji  that will surround the player with a barrier for a limited period, a yellow orb with the kanji  that will destroy all on-screen enemies, and various kinds of jewelry for extra points and temporary invincibility.

There are a total of nine stages in the game, in which its own boss awaits to challenge the player. Like in Sunset Riders, each player is graded at the end of a stage by how much they shot the boss; the player with the highest hit percentage will receive bonus points.

Plot
Mystic Warriors is set in a dystopian future in New York (this is notable due to the World Trade Center being seen in some stages), where an evil organization known as the Skull Enterprise has taken over the nation and plots a worldwide takeover. The player takes control of one of five young ninja who are being targeted by Skull forces: Spyros, Keima, Kojiro, Brad, and Yuri.

The game can be played by up to two or four players (depending on the game's configuration); after each player chooses their character, one of the remaining members of the group will get kidnapped (if four of the five are chosen instead, the last remaining character will be captured), prompting the remaining four to begin their mission. During their journey across several regions of Japan, the four ninja eventually find and rescue their kidnapped friend. However, their reunion is short-lived, and the rescued ninja soon performs a sacrificial move to free them from an electric trap, dying in the process. The rest of the game is spent with the remaining ninja avenging the death of their fallen comrade.

After defeating the Skull forces, the four remaining ninja mourn for the loss of their companion before returning home.

Soundtrack 
The complete soundtrack to Mystic Warriors is featured in the two-CD album Konami Amusement Sounds '93: Summer Edition, which was released on August 21, 1993, with the catalog number KICA-7616-7. Tracks 23–46 on Disc 2 are from the game.

Reception 
In Japan, Game Machine listed Mystic Warriors on their April 15, 1993 issue as being the ninth most-successful table arcade unit of the month.

See also
Mystic Warriors-based hardware

Notes

References

External links 
Mystic Warriors at GameFAQs
[http://www.klov.com/game_detail.php?game_id=8806 Mystic Warriors] on the Killer List of Videogames

1992 video games
1993 video games
Arcade video games
Arcade-only video games
Cooperative video games
Konami games
Video games about ninja
Run and gun games
Science fiction video games
Side-scrolling video games
Video games about revenge
Video games featuring female protagonists
Video games scored by Junya Nakano
Video games scored by Yuji Takenouchi
Video games set in New York City
Konami arcade games
Video games developed in Japan